Edna Agravante (born September 13, 1980 in Naga, Camarines Sur, Philippines) is a former Philippine international footballer who played as a striker.

She made her debut at the 2003 AFC Women's Championship in the 0–15 defeat against Japan. She was also named as part of the squad at the 2008 AFC Women's Asian Cup qualifiers.

Career statistics

International goals
Scores and results list the Philippines' goal tally first.

References

External links
 

1980 births
Living people
Filipino women's footballers
Philippines women's international footballers
Sportspeople from Naga, Camarines Sur
Women's association football forwards